The 2017 Copa Ciudad de Tigre was a professional tennis tournament played on hard courts. It was the first edition of the tournament which was part of the 2017 ATP Challenger Tour. It took place in Tigre, Argentina between 14 and 19 March 2017.

Singles main-draw entrants

Seeds

 1 Rankings are as of 6 March 2017.

Other entrants
The following players received wildcards into the singles main draw:
  Facundo Argüello
  Carlos Berlocq
  Andrea Collarini
  Juan Pablo Paz

The following player received entry into the singles main draw as an alternate:
  Juan Ignacio Londero

The following players received entry from the qualifying draw:
  Daniel Dutra da Silva
  Christian Lindell
  Genaro Alberto Olivieri
  Matías Zukas

The following player received entry into the singles main draw as a lucky loser:
  Marcelo Zormann

Champions

Singles

 Taro Daniel def.  Leonardo Mayer 5–7, 6–3, 6–4.

Doubles

 Máximo González /  Andrés Molteni def.  Guido Andreozzi /  Guillermo Durán 6–1, 6–7(6–8), [10–5].

References

Copa Ciudad de Tigre